Vaneyev or Vaneyeva is a Russian-language family name.

The surname may refer to:

Anatoly Aleksandrovich Vaneyev (1872–1899), Russian revolutionary

Russian-language surnames
Surnames of Russian origin